Suillia variegata is a Palearctic species of Heleomyzidae.

References

External links
Images representing Suillia variegata at BOLD

Heleomyzidae
Diptera of Europe
Insects described in 1862
Articles containing video clips
Taxa named by Hermann Loew